Nkonya Ahenkro is a small town and is the capital of Biakoye district, a district in the Oti Region of Ghana.  This name could be  derived from African Brazilian or Haitian Brazilian due to slavery

Geography

Location
Nkonya Ahenkro is bounded to the east by the village of Hohoe, and on south by the village of Dafor.
it has ten subdivided towns that begins with Asakyiri when entering the town from Kpando then Ahondzo, Akloba, Owulibito, Ntsumru, kedjebi, Ntumda, Tayi, Tepo then finally Wurupong.
The language spoken is [Nkonya] with farming and hunting as their main occupation.

See also
Biakoye District
Biakoye (Ghana parliament constituency)

References

External links and sources
 Biakoye District on GhanaDistricts.com

Populated places in the Oti Region